Norton & Wallis was an architectural firm in Los Angeles that designed several historic buildings. The firm included partners, Samuel Tilden Norton (1877–1959) and Frederick H. Wallis. Wallis is credited as the designer of the Upton Sinclair House, a National Historic Landmark in Monrovia, California.

Projects
 B'Nai B'rith Lodge (1923) at 9th and Union
 Upton Sinclair House (1923)
 Financial Center (Los Angeles) (1924) 704 South Spring Street
 Jewish Orphans Home of Southern California (1924) 
 Temple Sinai (Los Angeles) (1925) second site at 407 South New Hampshire, which became the Korean Philadelphia Presbyterian Church in 1960 when the temple moved to Westwood, Los Angeles.
 Young Men's Hebrew Association (Los Angeles) (1925) at Soto Street and Michigan Avenue  
 Israel Temple (Los Angeles) (1927) at Franklin and Argyle 
 William Fox Building (1928) (now the Fox Jewelry Mart at 608 South Hill Street  13 stories in an art deco style
 Clubhouse for the Council of Jewish Women (1928) 
 Shane & Regar Hollywood (1929) 6650 Hollywood Boulevard
 Los Angeles Theatre (1930)

References

External links
 A post with photos of Norton's work

Defunct architecture firms based in California
Architects from Los Angeles
Companies based in Los Angeles
Design companies disestablished in 1959
1959 disestablishments in California